= Alexander Schuchinsky =

Alexander Schuchinsky from Queen's University Belfast, Northern Ireland was named Fellow of the Institute of Electrical and Electronics Engineers (IEEE) in 2014 for contributions to the electromagnetic theory of complex and artificial media and their applications to passive intermodulation and novel devices.
